Harry Joseph Malinski (born 4 August 1991), known as CryptoVet, is an Asian-American writer, journalist, cryptocurrency analyst and retired veterinary surgeon. He was Chief Technology Officer of PennyFly Entertainment, named by Pepperdine University as one of the “Most Fundable Companies"in the United States. He advises and oversees the development of [web3] projects while also lobbying for the decentralization of money through cryptocurrency and financial freedom.

Early life 
Malinski graduated from the College of Veterinary Medicine in 2017, going on to practice for a non-profit organization that utilized his surgical skills to assist with the animal population in high-volume, high quality spay and neuters. During the pandemic, Malinski shifted from veterinary medicine to journalism and technology, focusing on cryptocurrencies and blockchain projects.

Career 
Malinski sought to provide free financial education through his YouTube channel. Malinski is recognized in cryptocurrency circles as “CryptoVet” for his knowledge of blockchain technology, charting analysis, NFTs, and trading. While streaming live on Twitch, he generated over $250,000 in profit through utilizing his trading strategies in real-time. A guest on web3 shows, he reported within the blockchain and NFT communities, going on to interview Cardano's founder Charles Hoskinson. Malinski co-hosts the interactive CryptoAnswered Podcast alongside Kelly Kellam on Twitter Spaces.

Malinski is the Chief technology officer for PennyFly Entertainment, a by-artists-for-artists collective that provides services for artists and producers. He focuses on providing clients ways to independently monetize through blockchain-based initiatives.

References 

American technology journalists
Chief technology officers
American veterinarians
1991 births
Living people